is a member of the Imperial House of Japan and the younger brother of Emperor emeritus Akihito. He is the second son and sixth born child of Emperor Shōwa and Empress Kōjun and is third in line to the Chrysanthemum Throne. Nobody follows Prince Hitachi in the line of succession. He is mainly known for philanthropic activities and his research on the causes of cancer.

Early life and education

Born at Tokyo Imperial Palace in Tokyo, Masahito held the childhood appellation .

Masahito received his primary and secondary schooling at the Gakushūin Peers' School. In late 1944, the Imperial Household Ministry evacuated Prince Yoshi and the Crown Prince to Nikkō, to escape the American bombing of Tokyo.

After the war, from 1947 to 1950, Mrs. Elizabeth Gray Vining tutored both princes and their sisters, the Princesses Kazuko, Atsuko, and Takako, in the English language. Her account of the experience is entitled Windows for the Crown Prince (1952).

Prince Yoshi received his undergraduate degree in chemistry from the Faculty of Science at Gakushuin University in 1958. He subsequently did postgraduate work in the Faculty of Science at Tokyo University. In 1969, he became a Research Associate of the Japanese Foundation for Cancer Research specializing in the study of cellular division. The results of his research have been reported in the technical journals of the Japanese Cancer Association, as well as of the American Association for Cancer Research.

In 1997, Prince Hitachi received an honorary doctorate from George Washington University in the United States, and in April 2001 received another from the University of Minnesota. In March 1999, he became an honorary member of the German Association for Cancer Research, in recognition of his significant scientific contributions to the field of cancer research.

Marriage

On 30 September 1964, the Prince married Hanako Tsugaru (born 19 July 1940), fourth daughter of the late Yoshitaka Tsugaru, a former count and a descendant of the daimyō of Tsugaru Domain. The following day, Emperor Shōwa granted him the title Hitachi-no-miya (Prince Hitachi), and authorization to start a new branch of the Imperial Family in celebration of his wedding.

Prince and Princess Hitachi have their official residence in a palace in large gardens off Komazawadori in Higashi, Shibuya. They have no children.

In September 2021, the Japanese government considered plans to amend the Imperial Household Law and allow Prince Hitachi to adopt a male member of the former shinnōke or ōke collateral branches of the imperial family in an effort to address the Japanese imperial succession debate.

Public service
Prince Hitachi is the honorary president of a wide variety of charitable organizations, especially those involving international exchange. Most recently, Prince and Princess Hitachi visited Nicaragua and El Salvador, to mark the 70th anniversary of the establishment of diplomatic relations with both countries in October 2005. They also made a visit to France in September 2007 and Peru, marking the celebration of 110 years since the establishment of a Japanese community in this country, June 2009.

Health
Prince Hitachi suffered from fever in late February 2023 and was hospitalized on 1 March. He was diagnosed with ureteral stones for which he underwent surgery the day after at the Japanese Red Cross Medical Center. He was discharged from hospital on 5 March.

Titles and styles

 28 November 1935 – 1 October 1964: His Imperial Highness Prince Yoshi
 1 October 1964 – present: His Imperial Highness Prince Hitachi

Honours

National honours
: Grand Cordon of the Order of the Chrysanthemum (28 November 1955)

Foreign honours
 : Knight of the Order of the Elephant (28 September 1965)
 : Knight Grand Cross of the Order of Merit of the Italian Republic (22 November 1965)
 : Member of the Order of the Benevolent Ruler (19 April 1960)

Honorary degree
 George Washington University
 University of Minnesota
 Chiang Mai University

Honorary positions
 Member of the Imperial House Council
 President of the Japanese Society for the Preservation of Birds
 President of the Japanese Society for Disabled Children
 President of the Japan Institute of Invention and Innovation
 President of the Japan-Denmark Society
 President of the Dainippon Silk Foundation
 President of the Japanese Society for Rehabilitation of Persons with Disabilities
 President of the Japan Art Association
 President of the Tokyo Zoological Park Society
 President of Maison Franco-Japonaise
 President of the Princess Takamatsu Cancer Research Fund
 Honorary President of the Japan-Sweden Society
 Honorary President of the Japan-Belgium Society
 Honorary President of the Japanese Foundation for Cancer Research
 Honorary President of Association Pasteur Japon
 Honorary Vice-President of the Japanese Red Cross Society

Ancestry

Patrilineal descent

Imperial House of Japan

 Descent prior to Keitai is unclear to modern historians, but traditionally traced back patrilineally to Emperor Jimmu
 Emperor Keitai, ca. 450–534
 Emperor Kinmei, 509–571
 Emperor Bidatsu, 538–585
 Prince Oshisaka, ca. 556–???
 Emperor Jomei, 593–641
 Emperor Tenji, 626–671
 Prince Shiki, ???–716
 Emperor Kōnin, 709–786
 Emperor Kanmu, 737–806
 Emperor Saga, 786–842
 Emperor Ninmyō, 810–850
 Emperor Kōkō, 830–867
 Emperor Uda, 867–931
 Emperor Daigo, 885–930
 Emperor Murakami, 926–967
 Emperor En'yū, 959–991
 Emperor Ichijō, 980–1011
 Emperor Go-Suzaku, 1009–1045
 Emperor Go-Sanjō, 1034–1073
 Emperor Shirakawa, 1053–1129
 Emperor Horikawa, 1079–1107
 Emperor Toba, 1103–1156
 Emperor Go-Shirakawa, 1127–1192
 Emperor Takakura, 1161–1181
 Emperor Go-Toba, 1180–1239
 Emperor Tsuchimikado, 1196–1231
 Emperor Go-Saga, 1220–1272
 Emperor Go-Fukakusa, 1243–1304
 Emperor Fushimi, 1265–1317
 Emperor Go-Fushimi, 1288–1336
 Emperor Kōgon, 1313–1364
 Emperor Sukō, 1334–1398
 Prince Yoshihito Fushimi, 1351–1416
 Prince Sadafusa Fushimi, 1372–1456
 Emperor Go-Hanazono, 1419–1471
 Emperor Go-Tsuchimikado, 1442–1500
 Emperor Go-Kashiwabara, 1464–1526
 Emperor Go-Nara, 1495–1557
 Emperor Ōgimachi, 1517–1593
 Prince Masahito, 1552–1586
 Emperor Go-Yōzei, 1572–1617
 Emperor Go-Mizunoo, 1596–1680
 Emperor Reigen, 1654–1732
 Emperor Higashiyama, 1675–1710
 Prince Naohito Kanin, 1704–1753
 Prince Sukehito Kanin, 1733–1794
 Emperor Kōkaku, 1771–1840
 Emperor Ninkō, 1800–1846
 Emperor Kōmei, 1831–1867
 Emperor Meiji, 1852–1912
 Emperor Taishō, 1879–1926
 Emperor Shōwa, 1901–1989
 Masahito, Prince Hitachi

References

External links

Their Imperial Highnesses Prince and Princess Hitachi at the Imperial Household Agency website

1935 births
Japanese princes
Living people
People from Tokyo
Gakushuin University alumni
Sons of emperors
20th-century Japanese scientists
21st-century Japanese scientists
Cancer researchers
Tokyo University of Science alumni